Elophos caelibaria is a moth of the family Geometridae. It is mainly found in the Alps at elevations between 2000 and 3000 metres, as well as in mountains in Spain and Slovenia.

Between males and females there is a phenotypic sexual dimorphism. The wingspan of the males is 24–32 mm. Females have only wing-stumps of less than 18 mm.
They live from June to August.

The larvae feed on various low-growing plants, including Saxifraga, Plantago, Rumex and Campanula species. They overwinter twice.

Subspecies
Elophos caelibaria caelibaria 
Elophos caelibaria jugicolaria Fuchs, 1901
Elophos caelibaria senilaria Fuchs, 1901
Elophos caelibaria spurcaria de La Harpe, 1853

External links 

www.faunaeur.org
www.lepiforum.de

Gnophini
Taxa named by Gustav Heinrich Heydenreich
Moths of Europe